The New Zealand Open in badminton is an international tournament held in New Zealand. In 2011, the New Zealand International was originally scheduled to be a Grand Prix event, but was downgraded to International Challenge level due to lack of funding. As of 2016, this tournament has been upgraded to Grand Prix Gold.

Previous winners

Performances by countries

References

External links
Official website

 
Badminton tournaments in New Zealand